Finsbury Park TMD was a railway traction maintenance depot situated in London, England. It was the first purpose built main line diesel locomotive depot opened in England and it was fully commissioned in April 1960. Finsbury Park was allocated British Railways depot code 34G under the original alphanumeric system; the two letter code of the depot was FP. The nearest railway station is Finsbury Park.

The maintenance shed held six roads. Roads seven to eleven were located to the east, with number ten road also accommodating the breakdown train shed. Additionally there were five roads of stabling in Clarence Yard, which was nearest to the main running lines.
 
The depot was downgraded in June 1981 and closed in October 1983. The site is now covered in residential flats which can be seen to the south-west of Finsbury Park station.

The Deltics

Following the closure of Kings Cross Top Shed and the withdrawal of steam locomotives, much of the traction power for express passenger workings on the East Coast Main Line was taken over by Class 55 Deltic diesel locomotives. Those allocated to Finsbury Park were named after famous racehorses, whilst those allocated to Haymarket TMD and Gateshead TMD were named after British Army regiments.

Finsbury Park's Deltics

References

Further reading

Railway depots in London
Buildings and structures in the London Borough of Islington